Sine is a trigonometric function.

Sine may also refer to:
 Maurice Sinet or Siné (1928–2016), a French cartoonist
 Intira Charoenpura or Sine, a Thai actress
 Sine FM, a community radio station based in Doncaster, South Yorkshire
 Short interspersed nuclear elements (SINEs), a short DNA sequences in eukaryote genomes
 Sine bar
 Sine (album), a 2008 album by C418

Mathematics
 Abbe sine condition
 Discrete sine transform
 Sine wave, a mathematical function
 Sine and cosine transforms
 Sine quadrant
 Sine-Gordon equation

Places
 Sinë, village in Albania
 Sine, Washington, a community in the United States
Kingdom of Sine, a former kingdom in modern Senegal

See also
SINE (disambiguation)
Port of Sines, a deep-water port in Portugal
Sines Municipality, a city and municipality in Portugal
Sinoatrial node
Sine qua non
Sign (disambiguation)